Abhinayashree is an evicted contestant on Bigg Boss (Telugu season 6).

Career
Her first major role came in Siddique's 2001 Tamil comedy Friends, which featured her alongside Vijay and Suriya. She received a breakthrough in her career after featuring alongside Allu Arjun in the 2004 Telugu film Arya in an item number for the song "Aa Ante Amalapuram". The success led to further offers for the actress in similar roles. She played her first lead role in the 2005 Telugu comedy Hungama appearing alongside Ali and Venu Madhav and signed on to shoot for thirty days after the director Krishna Reddy convinced her with the role. The actress won the Nandi Award for Best Female Comedian for her role in Paisalo Paramatma, her biggest recognition til date.

After appearing in a full-fledged supporting role in the 2007 Telugu film Adivaram Adavallaku Selavu, Abhinayashree opted against appearing in any more item numbers, but soon went back on her decision explaining that the likes of Mumaith Khan were successfully able to balance both.

Filmography

Television

References

External links
 

Indian film actresses
Actresses in Telugu cinema
Actresses in Tamil cinema
Actresses in Malayalam cinema
Actresses in Kannada cinema
21st-century Indian actresses
Nandi Award winners
Living people
Actresses from Chennai
Tamil Reality dancing competition contestants
Tamil television presenters
Indian women television presenters
1988 births
Bigg Boss (Telugu TV series) contestants